Garu (also Romanized as Garū, Gerow, and Garrū; also known as Gīrū) is a village in Kabud Gonbad Rural District, in the Central District of Kalat County, Razavi Khorasan Province, Iran. At the 2006 census, its population was 2,083, in 440 families.

References 

Populated places in Kalat County